Samtgemeinde Lathen is a Samtgemeinde in the district Emsland in Lower Saxony, Germany.

Following towns are situated in Lathen:

(Population 2005)

References 

Lathen

eo:Lathen